The Great Lakes Collegiate Hockey League (GLCHL) is an American Collegiate Hockey Association (ACHA) Division I level ice hockey league. The GLCHL is made up of nine schools, including one in Indiana, one in Illinois, and seven in Michigan.

History 
The league was announced in late 2009 and began play in the Fall of 2010 with six member teams, all located within the state of Michigan. Eastern Michigan, Michigan-Dearborn and Western Michigan all joined the league after competing as members of the Central States Collegiate Hockey League. Oakland and Adrian College previously competed as ACHA Division 1 Independents. Davenport joined after making the transition from ACHA Division 2 to Division 1. In 2012, Kent State announced they would move from the CSCHL to the league beginning in the 2012-13 season. Indiana Tech and Rochester College joined the league in the 2015-16 season. Before the 2017-18 season Indiana Tech left to join the newly formed NAIA Division. Calvin College moved up from ACHA Division 3 to fill the spot left by Indiana Tech. In 2019, Rochester and Michigan-Dearborn left the conference after the NAIA Division consolidated into the Wolverine–Hoosier Athletic Conference (WHAC), the all-sport conference for both RU and UMD. In recent years, though, the league has been able to supplement its membership with programs making the transition from ACHA D2 to D1, adding Grand Valley State for the 2020-2021 season, and Purdue University Northwest for the 2022-2023 season.

Adrian College has won the most regular season and playoff titles with seven regular season and five playoff titles.

Format
The conference plays a 16-game league schedule, two games against each team—home team alternates each season. In addition team schedules will include other ACHA Division I opponents. The GLCHL holds a league championship tournament at the end of the regular season in February.

Member schools

Current members

''Note: Adrian has NCAA Division III hockey competing in the Northern Collegiate Hockey Association. Western Michigan has NCAA Division I hockey competing in the National Collegiate Hockey Conference.

Former members

Conference arenas

Past champions

National tournament results
2011: #2 Davenport won the 2011 ACHA Men's DI National Championship defeating #1 Lindenwood 3-2 in overtime; #4 Adrian defeated 4-5 in 2ot by #5 Delaware in Quarter-final Round; #11 Oakland defeated 2-6 by #3 Ohio in Quarter-final Round.
2018: #2 ranked Adrian College won the ACHA Men's Div. I National Championship against #5 Illinois, defeating them 8-1.

References

External links
GLCHL

See also
 American Collegiate Hockey Association
 List of ice hockey leagues

ACHA Division 1 conferences
2010 establishments in the United States